The Round Rock Commercial Historic District is an historic district in Round Rock, Texas, listed on the National Register of Historic Places.

Description

The district has 22 contributing structures, including:

 100 East Main Street (1880): Shuey's Furniture Store; Old Broom Factory, a two-story limestone building
 101 East Main Street (1876): Kopperal's General Store (Fabric Designs), a one-story, stone-masonry building
 102 East Main Street (1879): Otto Reinke Building (Round Rock Travel and Tours, and Round Rock Leader), a two-story building
 103 East Main Street (1876): Miller's Exchange Bank (Earl's Brushy Creek Gallery), a one-story, stone-masonry building
 104 East Main Street (1947): Round Rock Insurance and John's Barber Shop
 105 East Main Street (1876): Sam Bass General Store, a one-story building
 109 East Main Street (1885): Maschall and McNeary, Attorneys, a one-story, stone-masonry building
 111 East Main Street (1916–1925): Round Rock Printing, a brick building
 112 East Main Street (1881)
 114 East Main Street (1881): Bo-Kay Florist
 115 East Main Street (1885): Gus's Drug Store, a one-story, stone-masonry building
 116 East Main Street (1880): Round Rock Professional Building
 117 East Main Street (1891): The Fair, a one-story, stone-masonry building
 118 East Main Street (1880): First National Bank
 118 East Main Street (1880): First National Bank
 119 East Main Street (1881): Robertson's Gift Shop, a one-story, stone-masonry building
 121 East Main Street (1877): Voight and Brady Grocery; also, W.J. Walsh General Merchandise (Kelly's Cleaners)
 200 East Main Street (1902–1909): Anderson-Nelson Company (Photocopy & Mike Faulk and Associates, Architects)
 203 East Main Street (1900): Nelson Hardware; "The Co-op", a two-story limestone building
 204 East Main Street (1902–1909): Economy Drug Store (Quick Pharmacy)
 206 East Main Street (1930s): Dr. Gregg's Office
 208 East Main Street (1873): Andrew J. Palm House (Round Rock Chamber of Commerce)
 107 South Mays Street (1878): Old Post Office Building (Masonic Lodge #227), a two-story building

Additionally, there are three non-contributing properties:
 108 and 110 East Main Street (1880)
 113 East Main Street: Round Rock of Music

See also
 National Register of Historic Places listings in Williamson County, Texas

References

External links
 

Buildings and structures completed in 1870
National Register of Historic Places in Williamson County, Texas
Round Rock, Texas
Historic districts on the National Register of Historic Places in Texas